"One Summer Dream" is a song written by Jeff Lynne and performed by the rock group Electric Light Orchestra (ELO) which made its first appearance on the band's fifth album, Face the Music, as the last track off the album. It also appeared on the box sets, Afterglow and Flashback.

It was released as the B-side of the hit single "Mr. Blue Sky" in 1978. The album version includes an orchestra intro but part of it was cut for the single. "One Summer Dream" (on different singles with "Mr. Blue Sky") has a fading difference for unknown reasons. Backing vocals by Ellie Greenwich.

"The seven ELO members outdo themselves, however, on One Summer Dream, a beautiful and evocative tune sung touchingly by Lynne. A trifle sentimental perhaps, but lyrically and musically, it displays more emotion (not to mention pure ability) than one ordinarily hears from a rock group."
Charley Walters (1 January 1976 Rolling Stone issue 203)

References

1975 songs
Jet Records singles
Songs written by Jeff Lynne
Electric Light Orchestra songs
Song recordings produced by Jeff Lynne